Maite Orsini Pascal  (born February 23, 1988 in Santiago, Chile) is a Chilean lawyer and politician, and former actress and model. Beginning in 2017, she has represented the 9th District in the Chamber of Deputies of Chile.

Acting career
Maite has played important roles in different TV series such as Los Venegas (1994–1997) and Fuera de control (1999). During her teenage years, she appeared in a vast number of commercials and got a few modeling gigs. She also appeared on the reality TVshow Amor ciego II and on another show called Yingo during May 2009. As of October 2009 she joined the cast of Calle 7, a reality TV game show where contestants compete to win cash and other prizes .

Besides Calle7, she was also a contestant on Circo de estrellas (as a replacement for Alejandra Fosalba), but then decided to leave for personal problems. On June 5, 2010 she and Francisco Rodriguez won the third season of Calle 7, and walked away with a monetary prize of six million Chilean pesos for both contestants.

She also collaborated with other members of Calle7 in producing the show's first CD album in which she starred in two of the song tracks; one called "Me vuelvo loca"and the other "No lo puedo evitar".

In 2010, Maite competed for "Queen of the Bicentennial in Colina" but remained first runner up after being defeated by Pamela Diaz.

In October 2010 it was announced that Maite and Francisco "Chapu" Puelles would travel to the United States of America, as part of a special report for the program "Buenos días a todos".

She left Calle 7 in November 2010, because she wanted to dedicate more time to school. In 2011, Orsini will star in a TVN series called El Laberindo de Alicia, playing the character of Dolores.

Personal life
Her parents are Ricardo Orsini and Maite Pascal, they are separated.

Filmography

Teleseries

Realities

References

External links 
Maite Orsini becomes the most voted deputy in District 9

1988 births
Chilean actresses
Chilean female models
Chilean people of French descent
Chilean people of Italian descent
Democratic Revolution politicians
People from Santiago
Living people
Chilean television personalities